Bruntsfield Hospital was a women's hospital based in the Bruntsfield area of Edinburgh, Scotland.

History

The hospital had its origins in public dispensary opened by Sophia Jex-Blake at 73 Grove Street in September 1878. It moved to 6 Grove Street, a building large enough to provide in-patient services, as the Edinburgh Hospital and Dispensary for Women and Children in 1885.

When Jex-Blake retired and moved away in 1899, the trustees acquired her house, Bruntsfield Lodge, and fitted it out as an 18-bed women's hospital. The hospital committee was led by well-connected women active in various social reform projects such as Flora Stevenson.

In 1910 the hospital merged with "The Hospice", a small maternity home which had been established by Elsie Inglis and the Medical Women's Club at 11 George Square some eleven years previously. A new ward block, designed by Arthur Forman Balfour Paul, was officially opened by Queen Mary in July 1911. The hospital was joined the National Health Service in 1948 and closed in 1989. The building was then converted for residential use and is now known as Greenhill Court.

References

External links
History of Bruntsfield Hospital (Lothian Health Services Archive)
Bruntsfield Hospital and Elsie Inglis Memorial Maternity Hospital (Lothian Health Services Archive)
Three Scottish Women's Hospitals from their foundations to 1948 - Lecture given by Margaret Menzies Campbell (Archived at University of Dundee. Also available from Mitchell Library, Glasgow)

Hospitals in Edinburgh
Defunct hospitals in Scotland
Hospitals established in 1878
1878 establishments in Scotland
Hospitals disestablished in 1989
1989 disestablishments in Scotland
History of Edinburgh
Dispensaries in the United Kingdom